Piene is a surname. Notable people with the surname include:

Chloe Piene (born 1972), American visual artist
Johannes Christian Piene (1832–1912), Norwegian businessman and politician
Otto Piene (1928–2014), German-American artist
Ragni Piene (born 1947), Norwegian mathematician